Sadiqullah Patan (born 27 August 1998) is an Afghan cricketer. He made his first-class debut for Mis Ainak Region in the 2017–18 Ahmad Shah Abdali 4-day Tournament on 29 April 2018. He made his Twenty20 debut on 13 October 2019, for Mis Ainak Knights in the 2019 Shpageeza Cricket League.

References

External links
 

1998 births
Living people
Afghan cricketers
Mis Ainak Knights cricketers
Place of birth missing (living people)